The 1988 Atlantic Conference baseball tournament was held from May 13 through 15, 1988 to determine the champion of the NCAA Division I the Atlantic 10 Conference, for the 1988 NCAA Division I baseball season.  This was the tenth iteration of the event, and was held at Bear Stadium in Boyertown, Pennsylvania.   won their third championship and earned the conference's automatic bid to the 1988 NCAA Division I baseball tournament.

Format and seeding
The top two teams in each division advanced to the tournament, with each division winner playing the second place team from the opposite division in the first round.  The teams played a double-elimination tournament.  West Virginia claimed the top seed over Penn State and Rhode Island claimed the second seed in the East over Saint Joseph's by tiebreaker.

Results

References

Tournament
Atlantic 10 Conference Baseball Tournament
Atlantic 10 Conference baseball tournament
Atlantic 10 Conference baseball tournament
Baseball in Pennsylvania
College sports in Pennsylvania
History of Berks County, Pennsylvania
Sports competitions in Pennsylvania
Sports in the Delaware Valley
Tourist attractions in Berks County, Pennsylvania